Peter Harvey House and Barn is a historic home and barn located in Pennsbury Township, Chester County, Pennsylvania. The original house was built between 1773 and 1777, and is a -story, three bay by two bay, stone dwelling with a gable roof. It has two interior gable end chimneys and a front porch added in the early 20th century.  The house was expanded in 1940, with a two bay extension added to the house making it five bays wide.  At the same time, a smaller two-story, stone and frame addition was built onto the east gable end.  Also on the property is a large stone and frame bank barn built in 1834.

It was added to the National Register of Historic Places in 1978.

References

Houses on the National Register of Historic Places in Pennsylvania
Houses completed in 1777
Houses in Chester County, Pennsylvania
National Register of Historic Places in Chester County, Pennsylvania